Start Talking is the self-produced debut album from Swedish heavy metal band Bulletrain, released 24 October 2014, through Metal Heaven records.

Recording process

The recordings for the band's debut began as early as in late 2011 when the group decided to record their third EP. It was later cancelled when they parted ways with the singer Mike Palace in 2012. Since the group had such amount of material already they took the chance and started recording the music for a full-length album. Together with Marcus Forsberg at Tweak Studios in Helsingborg they started the recording process in 2013. In the winter of 2013, Bulletrain went to Stockholm to finish the record with the vocals for the album with the producers RamPac (Johan Ramström, Patrik Magnusson). It was mixed and mastered by Buster Odeholm.

Track listing

Singles
 "Out of Control"
 "Phantom Pain"

Personnel
Jonas Tillheden - drums, backing vocals
Mattias Persson - lead guitar, backing vocals
Robin Bengtsson - rhythm guitar, backing vocals
Sebastian Sundberg - lead vocals
Niklas Månsson - bass guitar, backing vocals

Additional musicians

Gustav Bergström, bass guitar on tracks "From the bottom of my heart", "Out of control" and "Phantom pain".
Kalle Yttergren, backing vocals on tracks "Dicing with death" and "Joanna's secret".

References

Start Talking Markus'Heavy Music Blog.com Retrieved November 24, 2014
 Melodic Rock.com Retrieved November 24, 2014
 Classic Rock.com Retrieved November 24, 2014

External links
 Official website
 Metal Heaven

2014 debut albums
Bulletrain albums